This is a list of notable people from Sunbury County, New Brunswick. Although not everyone in this list was born in Sunbury County, they all live or have lived in Sunbury County and have had significant connections to the communities.

This article does not include People from Fredericton as they have their own section.

See also
List of people from New Brunswick

References

Sunbury